William James Tinnock (5 April 1930 – 3 April 2017) was a New Zealand rower.

William (known as Bill) Tinnock was born on 5 April 1930 in Auckland, New Zealand. At the 1950 British Empire Games he won the silver medal as part of the men's eight alongside crew members Donald Adam, Kerry Ashby, Murray Ashby, Bruce Culpan, Thomas Engel, Grahame Jarratt, Don Rowlands and Edwin Smith. At the next British Empire and Commonwealth Games in Vancouver, he won another silver medal in the men's coxed four.

Bill was the stroke seat of the first-ever Maddi Cup eight that won gold for Mount Albert Grammar. 

At the 1952 Summer Olympics he competed as part of the men's coxed four without progressing through to the finals. He is listed as New Zealand Olympian athlete number 75 by the New Zealand Olympic Committee.

Tinnock died on 3 April 2017.

References

External links 
 

1930 births
2017 deaths
New Zealand male rowers
Rowers at the 1950 British Empire Games
Rowers at the 1954 British Empire and Commonwealth Games
Rowers at the 1952 Summer Olympics
Olympic rowers of New Zealand
Commonwealth Games silver medallists for New Zealand
Commonwealth Games medallists in rowing
Medallists at the 1950 British Empire Games
Medallists at the 1954 British Empire and Commonwealth Games